Sara Viktoria Lindén (born 1 September 1983) is a Swedish football striker, who played for Göteborg FC in the Damallsvenskan.

In September 2008 Lindén was drafted into the senior Swedish national team for a pair of Euro 2009 qualifying matches against Romania and Ireland. She replaced Göteborg teammate Johanna Almgren who was injured. The 2–0 win over Romania in Västerås was Lindén's first cap and she retained her place in the squad for the UEFA Women's Euro 2009 final tournament.

Lindén suffered an anterior cruciate ligament injury in September 2012. Outside of football she is employed by ICA Banken in her hometown of Borås.

References

External links
 
 Player profile at SvFF 
 
 Kopparbergs/Göteborg FC player profile
 

1983 births
Living people
Swedish women's footballers
Sweden women's international footballers
BK Häcken FF players
Damallsvenskan players
Women's association football midfielders
Women's association football forwards
People from Borås
Sportspeople from Västra Götaland County